The Men's 1 km time trial event of the 2015 UCI Track Cycling World Championships was held on 20 February 2015.

Results
The race was started at 19:00.

References

Men's 1 km time trial
UCI Track Cycling World Championships – Men's 1 km time trial